Mirza Sahiban is one of the four popular tragic romances of the Punjab. The other three are Heer Ranjha, Sohni Mahiwal and Sassi Punnun. There are five other popular folklore stories in Punjab: Momal Rano, Umar Marvi, Lila Chanesar, Noori Jam Tamachi and Sorath Rai Diyach. These nine tragic romances are popular in Punjab.

The popular story was written by Pilu. Mirza and Sahiban were lovers who lived in Khewa (Kheiwa), a town in Sial Territory in the Jhang District, which was Sahiban's ancestral village. They loved each other and ran away together to live with each other 
and marry against Sahiban's parents wishes. While eloping Mirza stopped under a jand tree and rested and fell asleep. Sahiban did not want to begin her new life with her brothers' bloodshed . She decided to break all the arrows of Mirza thinking she will beg her brothers for their acceptance so that nobody would get hurt. When Sahiban's brothers reached them, Mirza woke up but discovered his arrows were broken and then he was killed by Sahiban's brothers. Sahiban couldn't bear this loss and chose to end her own life by stabbing herself with an arrow.

Along with Sohni Mahiwal and Sassi Punnuh are commonly known as 'Seven Queens' of Shah Abdul Latif Bhittai. They are culturally included in both Punjabi and Sindhi traditions.

Adaptations
There have been various film interpretations of the folk tale:
 Mirza Sahiban, a 1929 Indian silent film by Bhagwati Prasad Mishra.
Mirza Sahiban, a 1933 Indian Hindi-language film by Nagendra Majumdar starring Khurshid Begum and Kamlabai Gokhale.
Mirza Sahiban, a 1939 Indian Punjabi-language film by D. N. Madhok starring Zubeida.
Mirza Sahiban, a 1947 Indian Hindi-language romantic-drama film by K. Amarnath starring Noor Jehan and Trilok Kapoor
 Mirza Sahiban (1956) is a Pakistani Punjabi film starring Musarrat Nazir and Sudhir
Mirza Sahiban, a 1957 Indian Hindi-language romance film by Ravi Kapoor starring Shyama and Shammi Kapoor.
 Mirza Jat (1967) is a Pakistani Punjabi film starring Firdous and Ejaz Durrani
 Mirza Jat (1982) is a Pakistani Punjabi film starring Shahid Hameed.
Mirza Jatt, a 1992 Indian Punjabi-language romance film by Ravinder Ravi  starring Gugu Gill and Manjeet Kullar.
 Hero Hitler in Love, a 2011 Indian Punjabi-language film by Babbu Maan, starring Maan and Mouni Roy. It creates a modern Mirza and Sahiban story with a twist.
 Mirza – The Untold Story, a 2012 Indian Punjabi-language film directed by Baljit Singh Deo starring Gippy Grewal and Mandy Takhar. It is a modern rendition of Mirza and Sahiban story, with the title song sung by Arif Lohar, son of (late) Alam Lohar.
 Mirzya, a 2016 Indian Hindi-language film directed by Rakesh Omprakash Mehra, is based on Mirza and Sahiban and closely follows the original story. Harshvardhan Kapoor plays Mirza and Saiyami Kher plays Sahiba.
 Mirza Juuliet, a 2017 Indian Hindi-language film directed by Rajesh Ram Singh, starring Darshan Kumar and Piaa Bajpai in the lead roles. It is a modern retelling of the original story, set in Uttar Pradesh, showing the nexus between politicians and criminals.
 In 2022 Indian film Jersey (2022 film) featured song 'Maiyya mainu' by Sachet–Parampara compared Shahid Kapoor and Mrunal Thakur with mirza-sahiban

References

External links
 Punjabi Literature and Poetry

Love stories
Tragedies (dramas)
Punjabi folklore
Punjabi literature
Indian folklore
Indian literature
Pakistani folklore
Pakistani literature